SJ radar was a type of S band (10-cm) radar set used on American submarines during the Second World War.  The widespread use of the SJ radar, combined with the very low use of radar in the Imperial Japanese Navy gave great operational flexibility to the United States Navy's submarine campaign in the Pacific Ocean.

The first prototype SJ was deployed in December 1941, but it was mid-1942 before they became common equipment.  SJ radar was on all submarines by early 1943.  The SJ was the second type of radar deployed on submarines during the war, representing a substantial improvement over the previous SD radar. The SJ was a variant of the SG surface search radar used on surface warships, contained in sets capable of fitting through submarine hatches for installation and designed to lie close to the curved hulls.

The SJ provided directional information, provided highly accurate distance information, and provided information about surface contacts as well as low-flying aircraft.

The SJ radar was even used as a communications device.  When used with a telegraph key, the SJ radar could send signals on a point-to-point basis between two submarines operating in a wolf pack.  The directionality of the antenna and the short range provided relatively high security for this transmission.

The museum sub  has an operating example of the radar.

References

Military radars of the United States
World War II American electronics
World War II radars
Naval radars
Military equipment introduced from 1940 to 1944